Sam Elliott (born 18 February 2000) is an Australian cricketer. 

In May 2019, Elliott was awarded a rookie contract with Victoria ahead of the 2019–20 season.  He made his List A debut on 8 April 2021, for Victoria in the 2020–21 Marsh One-Day Cup. He made his Twenty20 debut on 5 December 2021, for the Melbourne Stars in the 2021–22 Big Bash League season. He made first-class debut for Victoria in November 2022.

His father, Matthew, played Test cricket for Australia.

In 2018 Elliot completed a Diploma of Sport and Rec Management at Box Hill Institute.

References

External links
 

2000 births
Living people
Australian cricketers
Victoria cricketers
Melbourne Stars cricketers
Place of birth missing (living people)